In finite group theory, the Higman–Sims asymptotic formula gives an asymptotic estimate on number of groups of prime power order.

Statement
Let  be a (fixed) prime number. Define  as the number of isomorphism classes of groups of order . Then:

References 
 
 
 

group theory
Theorems in group theory